The Kru languages are spoken by the Kru people from the southeast of Liberia to the west of Ivory Coast.

Classification
According to Güldemann (2018), Kru lacks sufficient lexical resemblances and noun class resemblances to conclude a relationship with Niger-Congo. Glottolog considers Kru an independent language family.

Etymology
The term "Kru" is of unknown origin. According to Westermann (1952) it was used by Europeans to denote a number of tribes speaking related dialects. Marchese (1989) notes the fact that many of these peoples were recruited as "crew" by European seafarers; "the homonymy with crew is obvious, and is at least one source of the confusion among Europeans that there was a Kru/crew tribe".

History
Andrew Dalby noted the historical importance of the Kru languages for their position at the crossroads of African-European interaction. He wrote that "Kru and associated languages were among the first to be encountered by European voyagers on what was then known as the Pepper Coast, a centre of the production and export of Guinea and melegueta pepper; a once staple African seaborne trade". The Kru languages are known for some of the most complex tone systems in Africa, rivaled perhaps only by the Omotic languages.

Current status

Recent documentation has noted "Kru societies can now be found along the coast of Monrovia, Liberia to Bandama River in Côte d'Ivoire". "Villages maintain their ties based on presumed common descent, reinforced by ceremonial exchanges and gifts".  The Kru people and their languages, although now many speak English (in Liberia) or French (in Côte d'Ivoire) as a second language, are said to be "dominant in the southwest region where the forest zone reaches the coastal lagoons".  The Kru people rely on the forest for farming, supplemented by hunting for their livelihood.

Subgroups and associated languages 
The Kru languages include many subgroups such as Kuwaa, Grebo, Bassa, Belle, Belleh, Kwaa and many others. According to Breitbonde, categorization of communities based on cultural distinctiveness, historical or ethnic identity, and socio-political autonomy "may have brought about the large number of distinct Kru dialects; "Although the natives were in many respects similar in type and tribe, every village was an independent state; there was also very little intercommunication". Breitbonde notes the Kru people were categorized based on their cultural distinctiveness, separate historical or ethnic identities, and social and political autonomy. This is the possible reason for so many subgroups of the Kru language. As noted by Fisiak, there is very little documentation on the Kru and associated languages.

Marchese's (1989) classification of Kru languages is as follows. Many of these languages are dialect clusters and are sometimes considered more than a single language.

Ethnologue adds Neyo, which may be closest to Dida or Godie.

Grammar
Kru word order is primarily subject-verb-object (SVO), but can also often be subject-object-verb (SOV).

Comparative vocabulary
Sample basic vocabulary of 12 Kru languages from Marchese (1983):

An additional sample basic vocabulary of 21 Kru languages from Marchese (1983):

Numerals
Comparison of numerals in individual languages:

Comparison of numerals in Kru languages from Marchese (1983):

Body parts (head)
Parts of the head from Marchese (1983):

Body parts (lower)
Other body parts from Marchese (1983):

Other nouns
Miscellaneous nouns from Marchese (1983):

Nature
Nature-related words from Marchese (1983):

Verbs (1)
Some basic verbs from Marchese (1983):

Verbs (2)
Other basic verbs from Marchese (1983):

Reconstruction

According to Marchese Zogbo (2012), Proto-Kru had:

phonemic nasalized vowels
four level tones
 *CVCV-(C)V and probably *CVV syllable structure. *CCV syllables, and possibly also *CVV syllables, are derived from *CVCV roots.
SVO word order, but with much OV typology
suffixing morphology
perfective and imperfective aspects

Proto-Kru consonants (Marchese Zogbo 2012):

Derived consonants:
/ɟ/ is likely derived via palatalization (*g > ɟ), e.g. *gie > ɟie.
 *c, *ɲ, *kʷ, *gʷ, *ŋʷ are derived from alveolar or velar consonants preceding high back or high front vowels.
/ɗ/ is likely derived from *l.

Proto-Kru vowels (Marchese Zogbo 2012):

There is a clear bipartite division between Western and Eastern Kru marked by phonological and lexical distinctions. Some isoglosses between Western Kru and Eastern Kru:

References

 Westerman, Diedrich Hermann (1952) Languages of West Africa (Part II). London/New York/Toronto: Oxford University Press.

External links
PanAfrican L10n page on Kru/Bassa

Language families
Languages of Liberia
Languages of Ivory Coast